, better known as , is a Japanese comedian and writer who is represented by the talent agency, Horipro. He was born in Tokyo, and graduated from Toho Junior and Senior High School and Japan University of the Arts Faculty Department of Photography.

Filmography

Drama

Radio series

Internet series

References

External links
Official profile 

Japanese comedians
Japanese writers
1979 births
Living people
Comedians from Tokyo